Sosa is a Spanish surname of Portuguese and Galician origin, originating from the Portuguese Sousa. The  Sousa Family is of noble and Visigoth origin. Portuguese people brought the Sousa surname to Galicia, and from there it spread in the former Spanish colonies. Sometimes, both variants are used to refer to the same person or family in old texts. 

Notable people with the surname include:

 Antonieta Sosa (born 1940), Venezuelan-American performance artist
 Arlenis Sosa (born 1989), Dominican model
 Arturo Sosa (born 1948), Venezuelan Superior General of the Jesuit order 
 Borna Sosa (born 1998), Croatian footballer
 Clara Sosa (born 1993), Paraguayan model, television personality and beauty queen
 David Sosa, American philosopher
 Édgar Sosa (basketball) (born 1988), Dominican-American basketball player
 Édgar Sosa (boxer) (born 1979), Mexican boxer
 Edmundo Sosa (born 1996), Panamanian baseball player
 Elías Sosa (born 1950), Dominican baseball player
 Ernest Sosa (born 1940), Cuban-American philosopher
 Francisco Sosa (20th century), Paraguayan footballer
 Gilberto Sosa (born 1960), Mexican boxer
 Henry Sosa (born 1985), Dominican baseball player
 Iván Sosa (born 1997), Colombian cyclist
 Jason Sosa (born 1988), Puerto Rican-American boxer 
 Jerónimo de Sosa (17th century), Spanish friar and genealogist
 Jorge Sosa (born 1977), Dominican baseball player
 José Ernesto Sosa (born 1985), Argentine footballer
 José Romulo Sosa Ortiz (born 1948), Mexican singer known as José José
 Julio Sosa (guitarist), Argentine guitarist
 Julio Sosa (1926–1964), Uruguayan tango singer
 Lucía Sosa (athlete) (born 1978), Mexican paralympic athlete
 Lucía Sosa (politician) (born 1957), Ecuadorian teacher and politician
 Mercedes Sosa (1935–2009), Argentine singer
 Omar Sosa (born 1965), Cuban jazz pianist 
 Osvaldo Sosa (1945–2020), Argentine footballer and manager
 Patricia Sosa (born 1956), Argentine singer
 Porfirio Lobo Sosa (born 1947), Honduran politician
 Roberto Sosa (Argentine footballer) (born 1975), Argentine footballer
 Roberto Sosa (poet) (1930–2011), Honduran poet
 Roberto Sosa (Uruguayan footballer) (1935–2008), Uruguayan goalkeeper 
 Rubén Sosa (born 1966), Uruguayan footballer 
 Sammy Sosa (born 1968), Dominican baseball player
 Santiago Sosa (born 1999), Argentine footballer 
 Sebastián Sosa (born 1986), Uruguayan footballer 
 Tomás Méndez Sosa (1927–1995), Mexican singer and composer
 Victoriano Sosa (born 1974), Dominican boxer

See also
Sosa (disambiguation)

References

Surnames of Uruguayan origin
Spanish-language surnames